Leontopolis (Egyptian: Ney-ta-hut) is the Greek name for the modern area of Tell el Yehudiye or Tell el-Yahudiya (Egyptian Arabic: Jewish Mound). It was an ancient city of Egypt in the 13th nome of Lower Egypt (the Heliopolite Nome), on the Pelusiac branch of the Nile. This site is known for its distinctive pottery known as Tell el-Yahudiyeh Ware.

Discovery

Linant identified the site in 1825, but Niebuhr had identified it earlier, in the late 18th century.

Earthwork enclosures
The site includes some massive rectangular earthwork enclosures of the late Middle Kingdom or Second Intermediate Period. They measure around 515m by 490m, and their purpose is probably defensive. These earthen walls were sloping and plastered on the outer face, and almost vertical on the inner face. Egyptian parallels for such a structure are lacking. This enclosure is often interpreted as a fortification built by the Hyksos; it is generally known as the "Hyksos Camp". There are also cemeteries from the Middle Kingdom and later. A temple and palace of Ramesses II has also been excavated. Also, there was a palace of Ramesses III with some fine decorations.

Jewish temple

In the reign of Ptolemy VI Philometor (180–145 BC) a temple, modelled after that of Jerusalem, was founded by the exiled Jewish priest Onias IV. The Hebrew colony, which was attracted by the establishment of their national worship at Leontopolis, and which was increased by the refugees from the oppressions of the Seleucid kings in Judea, flourished there for more than three centuries afterwards. After the outbreak of the Jewish War, the Leontopolite temple was closed in the first century CE, amid the general backlash against Judaism.

Gallery

Citations

See also
 Land of Onias

References
 Manfred Bietak: Tell el-Yahudiya, in: Kathryn A. Bard (Hg.): Encyclopedia of the Archaeology of Ancient Egypt, London/New York 1999, 791–792.
 John S. Holladay Jr.: Yahudiyya, Tell el-, in: D. B. Redford (Hg.): The Oxford Encyclopedia of Ancient Egypt III, Oxford 2001, 527–529.
 Edouard Naville: The mound of the Jew and the city of Onias, London 1890.
 Richard Talbert, Barrington Atlas of the Greek and Roman World,, p. 74.
 A.-P. Zivie: Tell el-Jahudija, in: Lexikon der Ägyptologie VI, 331–335.

External links
 Archaeologic survey
 Tell el-Yahudiya at egyptsites.wordpress.com

Archaeological sites in Egypt
Hyksos cities in ancient Egypt
Former populated places in Egypt
Tells (archaeology)